is an interchange passenger railway station located in the city of Hashimoto, Wakayama Prefecture, Japan, operated by the West Japan Railway Company (JR West) and the private Nankai Electric Railway.

Lines
Hashimoto Station is served by the Wakayama Line and is located 45.1 kilometers from the terminus of the line at Ōji Station. It is also served by the Nankai Kōya Line, and is located 44.7 kilometers from the terminus of that line at Shiomibashi Station and 44.0 kilometers from Namba Station.

Station layout
The station consists of two island platforms and one side platform connected to the station building by a footbridge. The side platform and the south island platform are used for the JR Wakayama Line (tracks 1, 2, 3). The north island platform is used by the Nankai Railway Kōya Line (tracks 4, 5). The station is staffed and has a Midori no Madoguchi ticket office.

Platforms

Adjacent stations

History
Hashimoto Station opened on April 11, 1898 as a station on the Kiwa Railway. The Kiwa Railway became part of the Kansai Railway in 1904, which was nationalized in 1907. On March 11,1915, the Takano Mountain Railway connected to Hashimoto Station, and changed its name to the Osaka Takano Railway a month later.  The Osaka Takano Railway merged with the Nankai Railway Company in 1922.  In 1944, the Nankai Railway was forced to merge with Kintetsu per Japanese government orders. The station was bombed a freight train stopped at the station on July 24, 1945 by US military aircraft in World War II,resulting in five fatalities. In 1947, the Nankai Railway was spun out by Kintetsu to become an independent company once again.

Passenger statistics
In fiscal 2019, the JR portion of the station was used by an average of 2209 passengers daily (boarding passengers only) and the Nankai portion of the station was used by 7544 passengers daily (boarding passengers only). .

Surrounding area
 Hashimoto City Hall
 Wakayama Prefectural Kosadaoka Junior High School / Hashimoto High School
 Hashimoto City Hashimoto Junior High School
 Mount Koya

See also
List of railway stations in Japan

References

External links
	
 JR West Hashimoto Station Official Site
 Nankai Hashimoto Station Official Site

Railway stations in Japan opened in 1898
Railway stations in Wakayama Prefecture
Hashimoto, Wakayama